Thomas Løvold (born 27 January 1981) is a Norwegian curler.

At Junior level, Løvold competed as skip and won gold medals at the 2002 and 2003 World Junior Curling Championships "B" tournaments.

He has gained worldwide attention for having played as the alternate for Team Thomas Ulsrud at the 2010 Vancouver Winter Olympics and played third for Team Torger Nergård at the 2010 World Curling Championship in Cortina d'Ampezzo, Italy, winning the silver medal at both tournaments.

Thomas Løvold also skips his own team on World Curling Tour events. His most successful tournament was the 2009 Lucerne Curling Trophy where his team made it to the semi-finals but lost to Team Ralph Stöckli of Switzerland.

Personal life
Løvold is married and has a daughter. He is employed as a national coach. He lives in Oslo, Lillehammer and Hamar.

Teams

References

External links
 Official homepage of Team Ulsrud
 

Living people
Norwegian male curlers
Curlers at the 2010 Winter Olympics
Olympic curlers of Norway
Olympic silver medalists for Norway
1981 births
Olympic medalists in curling
Medalists at the 2010 Winter Olympics
Norwegian curling coaches
European curling champions
Universiade medalists in curling
Universiade silver medalists for Norway
Competitors at the 2009 Winter Universiade
Sportspeople from Oslo
Sportspeople from Lillehammer
Sportspeople from Hamar
21st-century Norwegian people